Beckwith is a small settlement in North Yorkshire, England.

The place name was first recorded in about 972 as bec wudu, Old English for "beech wood".  The place was historically a hamlet in the ancient parish of Pannal in the West Riding of Yorkshire.  It was the ancient seat of the Beckwith family, which owned property here until 1753.  It gave its name to the now larger village of Beckwithshaw, 1 mile west.

In 1974 Beckwith became part of Harrogate district in the new county of North Yorkshire.  In 2010 the parish of Pannal was renamed Beckwithshaw.

References 

Villages in North Yorkshire